Wanny van Gils (February 10, 1959 – July 28, 2018) was a Dutch football player and coach.

Club career
He was under contract with NAC Breda, Beringen and Willem II. His wonderful solo-goal against Eindhoven in 1991 was long time dubbed as "the lost goal" since there seemed to be no footage of it.

Personal life
After football, he became an insurance consultant and began his own business in financial services. He also managed VV TSC, a Dutch football club.

References

1959 births
2018 deaths
People from Oosterhout
Footballers from North Brabant
Association football forwards
Dutch footballers
NAC Breda players
K. Beringen F.C. players
Willem II (football club) players
Eredivisie players
Dutch expatriate footballers
Expatriate footballers in Belgium
Dutch expatriate sportspeople in Belgium